Tatineni Rama Rao (1938 – 20 April 2022) was an Indian filmmaker. He directed 75 Hindi and Telugu feature films between 1966 and 2000.

Career
Rao started his work in the film industry in the late 1950s as the assistant director of his cousin T. Prakash Rao and Kotayya Pratyagatma, before making his directorial debut with 1966 Telugu film Navarathri.

According to Encyclopædia Britannica, Rao was "the man who established the 'Madras movie', or Hindi films funded primarily by southern capital, as a viable commercial option in the all-India market..."

He was the father of successful film producer T. Ajay Kumar.

Filmography

Director

Producer

Hindi
 Aakhree Raasta
Andhaa Kaanoon
Ek Hi Bhool
John Jani Janardhan
Sansar

Tamil
Naan Sigappu Manithan
Adhisaya Piravi
Naattai Thirudathe
 Dhill
 Youth
 Arul
 Unakkum Enakkum
 Malaikottai
Ya Ya

Telugu

References

External links

 

1938 births
2022 deaths
20th-century Indian film directors
Telugu film directors
Hindi-language film directors
Filmfare Awards South winners
Film directors from Andhra Pradesh
People from Krishna district
Telugu film producers
Film producers from Andhra Pradesh